Pamela Duncan Edwards is a British born children's author who now lives in the US. She has published over forty picture books for children, both in America and Britain.

External links
 Official website
 Booklist
 Video interview with Pamela Duncan Edwards

Year of birth missing (living people)
American children's writers
Living people